In organic chemistry, the desulfonation reaction is the hydrolysis of sulfonic acids:
RC6H4SO3H + H2O → RC6H5 + H2SO4
The reaction applied to aryl and naphthylsulfonic acids.  It is the reverse of sulfonation. The temperature of desulfonation correlates with the ease of the sulfonation.

Applications in synthesis
This reactivity is exploited in the regiospecific preparation of many di- and tri-substituted aromatic compounds. 2-Chlorotoluene for example can be prepared by chlorination of p-toluenesulfonic acid, followed by hydrolysis. The method is also useful for the preparation of 2,6-dinitroaniline and 2-bromophenol via phenol-2,4-disulfonic acid.

References

Organic reactions
Substitution reactions